Sacco and Vanzetti were two Italian anarchists who were executed for murder in the United States in 1927.

Sacco and Vanzetti may also refer to:
Sacco & Vanzetti (1971 film), an Italian film
The Diary of Sacco and Vanzetti, a 2004 docu-drama
Sacco and Vanzetti (2006 film), a documentary film
Sacco and Vanzetti (Blitzstein opera), 2001 opera
Sacco and Vanzetti (Coppola opera), 2001 opera
Sacco and Vanzetti (play), 1960 Italian play

Places

Ukraine
 Sakko I Vantsetti, village in Donetsk Oblast

See also 
 Vanzetti